Kiyan Michael is an American politician serving as a member of the Florida House of Representatives for the 16th district. She assumed office on November 8, 2022.

Career 
Michael served in the United States Navy and was a member of the Black Voices for Trump Advisory Board. Michael has also provided commentary on immigration policy for Fox News. She was elected to the Florida House of Representatives in November 2022.

References 

Living people
Republican Party members of the Florida House of Representatives
Women state legislators in Florida
African-American state legislators in Florida
People from Jacksonville, Florida
Politicians from Jacksonville, Florida
21st-century African-American politicians
21st-century American politicians
21st-century American women politicians
1964 births